A Stormy Knight is a 1917 American silent comedy mystery film directed by Elmer Clifton and starring Franklyn Farnum, Jean Hersholt and Agnes Vernon.

Cast
 Franklyn Farnum as John Winton
 Jean Hersholt as Dr. Fraser
 Agnes Vernon as Mary Weller
 Hayward Mack as Richard Weller
 Frank MacQuarrie as Mr. Weller

References

Bibliography
 Robert B. Connelly. The Silents: Silent Feature Films, 1910-36, Volume 40, Issue 2. December Press, 1998.

External links
 

1917 films
1917 comedy films
1910s English-language films
American silent feature films
Silent American comedy films
American black-and-white films
Universal Pictures films
Films directed by Elmer Clifton
1910s American films